I Funny: A Middle School Story, also known as I Funny, is a realistic fiction novel by James Patterson and Chris Grabenstein. It was published by Little, Brown and Company in 2012. It was followed by I Even Funnier (2013), I Totally Funniest (2015), I Funny TV (2016), I Funny: School of Laughs (2017) and The Nerdiest, Wimpiest, Dorkiest I Funny Ever (2018).

Summary
Wheelchair-using middle-schooler Jamie Grimm has recently moved in with his aunt’s cheerless family after his own family died in a car crash that left him paralyzed from the waist down. Despite Jamie’s desire to be treated like an ordinary kid and his grief for his lost family, he is a natural comedian and displays this in his day-to-day life. Much of this is fueled by his friends’ reactions to his one-liners and the encouragement of his warmhearted uncle. He eventually goes on to win the New York state kid comic contest.

Characters
Jamie Grimm is the disabled protagonist of the story. He enters the Planet's Funniest Kid Comic Contest and wins the Long Island competition, then moves on to the state competition and wins. He was involved in a serious car accident two years prior that killed his parents and his younger sister, Jenny, and left him paralyzed from the legs down. He lives in Long Beach, New York with his aunt and uncle and their three children (who he refers to as "the Smileys" because they never smile or laugh). He uses comedy as a way of coping with his emotions and dealing with things in his every day life.
 Suzie Orolvsky (whom Jamie refers to as "Cool Girl") is a popular girl who Jamie becomes friends with.
 Stevie Kosgrov is Jamie's adoptive brother and the middle school bully. He often makes jokes at Jamie's expense.
 Uncle Frankie is Jamie's other uncle. He owns a diner and is shown to be very talented with yo-yo tricks. He is close with Jamie.
 Joey Gaynor is one of Jamie's best friends. He has long hair, a nose ring, and several tattoos. He is said to be obsessed with girls.
 Jimmy Pierce is another of Jamie's best friends. He is said to be nerdy. He has glasses, and often wears a black hat with a flat top and broad rim.
 Gilda Gold is another of Jamie's best friends. She assists him in creating new jokes, and she uploads his sets to YouTube. 
 Shecky is a boy from Schenectady who competes in the New York finals against Jamie. He tells distasteful and insulting jokes, and is overconfident and arrogant.
 Judy Nazemetz is a girl from Manhattan who competes in the New York finals. She becomes friendly with Jamie during their time backstage.

References

External links

 Official James Patterson Middle School web site
 Official James Patterson US web site
 Reviews

 Novels by James Patterson
2012 American novels
Little, Brown and Company books